Raise It Up may refer to:
Raise It Up (album), a 2015 album by StillWell
"Raise It Up" (Slum Village song), 2001
"Raise It Up" (August Rush song), 2007
"Rabbit Heart (Raise It Up)", a 2009 song by Florence and the Machine